Terenzo Bozzone (born 1 March 1985) is a professional triathlete from New Zealand who races primarily in long distance, non-drafting events. He is the winner of the 2008 Ironman 70.3 World Championship.

Athletic career 
Bozzone was born in South Africa and moved to New Zealand with his family as a young boy.  He was a talented athlete at school winning many national titles in a variety of disciplines including cross country running, cycling, swimming and multisport.  After finishing school he focused on multisport and won the 2001 & 2002 Junior Men's Elite Duathlon World Championship and the 2002 & 2003 Junior Men's Elite Triathlon World Championship.

Bozzone holds the current course record for the Wildflower Triathlon set in 2006. Bozzone completed the half-Ironman distance in 3 hours, 53 minutes and 43 seconds, beating the previous record by 6 minutes.
  
In 2008, Bozzone capped off a successful year by winning the Ironman 70.3 World Championships in Clearwater, Florida setting a then course record of 3:40:10. Bozzone then spent the next couple of years battling an Achilles tendon injury. In 2013, he capped off a good season of racing with a second-place finish at 2013 Ironman 70.3 World Championships.

Injury
On 3 July 2018, Bozzone was seriously injured when he was hit by a truck while cycling near Kumeu. He was rushed to Auckland City Hospital in a serious condition. Bozzone suffered face and head injuries and was concussed as a result of the crash.

Achievements in other sports 
He also represented his country successfully in athletics, winning the silver medal in the 5000 metres race at the 2002 Oceania Championships in Christchurch in a time of 15:05.80 minutes.

References

External links
 Terenzo Bozzone website

New Zealand male triathletes
1985 births
Living people
People educated at Rangitoto College